Georgia Campagnale (born 9 December 1996) is an Australian professional soccer midfielder who played for Adelaide United in the W-League Campagnale was the winner of the 2021 Client of the Year at The Fit Space alongside her older brother Sam.

Club career

Adelaide United
Campagnale started her Adelaide United career in 2014. She made her debut in a 2–0 loss to Sydney FC. On 1 December 2018, Campagnale scored her first goal for Adelaide United with a 97th minute last-gasp equaliser against Melbourne City FC. She had her contract renewed with the club in September 2019. Campagnale holds the record for the most games for Adelaide United women's team of all time. Campagnale departed Adelaide United ahead of the 2021–22 A-League Women season.

Personal life
Campagnale is studying for a master's degree in Nutrition and Dietetics. She is of Italian descent.

References

External links
 

1996 births
Living people
Adelaide United FC (A-League Women) players
Women's association football fullbacks
Women's association football midfielders
Australian women's soccer players
Australian people of Italian descent